Aybek Abdymomunov (born December 20, 1985) is a male amateur boxer from Kyrgyzstan. He qualified to compete at the 2004 Summer Olympics in the bantamweight division (– 54 kg)where he lost in the first round to Pakistan's Mehrullah Lassi.

Abdymomunov qualified for the 2004 Athens Games as a bantamweight by ending up in second place at the 2004 Asian Championships in Puerto Princesa. In the final he lost to Uzbekistan's Bahodirjon Sooltonov.

References
sports-reference

External links
 

1985 births
Living people
Kyrgyzstani male boxers
Bantamweight boxers
Olympic boxers of Kyrgyzstan
Boxers at the 2004 Summer Olympics